Askopan ( Eivo) is an East Papuan language of Bougainville, an island to the east of New Guinea. It is one of several languages in the area that go by the name Eivo.

References

Languages of the Autonomous Region of Bougainville
North Bougainville languages